Bălțata may refer to several villages in Romania:

 Bălțata, a village in Cuca Commune, Argeș County
 Bălțata, a village in Sărata Commune, Bacău County

and a commune in Moldova:
 Bălțata, Criuleni, a commune in Criuleni district